Super Panavision 70 is the marketing brand name used to identify movies photographed with Panavision 70 mm spherical optics between 1959 and 1983.

Ultra Panavision 70 was similar to Super Panavision 70, though Ultra Panavision lenses were anamorphic, which allowed for a significantly wider aspect ratio. However, Ultra Panavision 70 was extremely rare and has only been used on a handful of films since its inception.

History
During the late 1950s, the Hollywood filmmaking community decided that changing from filming in the commonly accepted 35 mm format to 65 mm film would provide viewing audiences with an enhanced visual experience, compared to an anamorphic widescreen image. To this end, cameras began to be designed to handle 65 mm film stock. The first camera system to be released using this format was Todd-AO, in 1955. The second was MGM Camera 65, a system designed by Panavision, which was introduced in 1956. In 1959, Panavision introduced Super Panavision 70 to compete with these two systems. Unlike its counterpart Ultra Panavision 70, which used anamorphic lenses, Super Panavision used spherical lenses to create a final aspect ratio of 2.20:1.

Some of the films made in Super Panavision 70 were presented in 70 mm Cinerama in select theaters. Special optics were used to project the 70 mm prints onto a deeply curved screen to mimic the effect of the original three-strip Cinerama process.

The terms "Super Panavision 70", "Panavision 70" and "Super Panavision" were interchangeable, whereas the term "70mm Panavision" referred to films shot in 35mm anamorphic Panavision and blown up to 70mm for release.

Movies using Super Panavision 70
 The Big Fisherman (1959)
 Exodus (1960)
 West Side Story (1961)
 Lawrence of Arabia (1962)
 My Fair Lady (1964)
 Cheyenne Autumn (1964)
 Lord Jim (1965)
 Grand Prix (1966) – presented in 70 mm Cinerama
 2001: A Space Odyssey (1968) – presented in 70 mm Cinerama
 Ice Station Zebra (1968) – presented in 70 mm Cinerama 
 Chitty Chitty Bang Bang (1968)
 Mackenna's Gold (1969)
 Krakatoa, East of Java (1969) – selected scenes in Todd-AO – presented in 70 mm Cinerama 
 Song of Norway (1970) – advertised as "on the Cinerama screen" in some countries 
 Ryan's Daughter (1970)
 Close Encounters of the Third Kind (1977) – special effects shots only; early promotional material erroneously suggested that the entire film was produced in Super Panavision 70
 Tron (1982) – 'Real world' live-action filmed in color 65 mm; Computer world live action filmed in 65 mm B&W, composited to a VistaVision intermediate, and optically printed back to 70 mm IP. CGI sequences recorded to VistaVision.
 Brainstorm (1983) – virtual reality sequences only
 Auto-E-Motion (1984) – BMW promotional short subject
 The Abyss (1989) – special effects shots only
 Warriors of the Wasteland (1989) - short film
 Apollo 11 (2019)

Panavision System 65/Super 70
In 1991, as a response to an increased demand for 65 mm cameras (in the mid-1980s Steven Spielberg had wanted to film Empire of the Sun in Super Panavision 70 but did not want to work with the old 65 mm camera equipment), Panavision introduced an updated line of 65 mm cameras and optics known as Panavision System 65 and monikered in advertising and release prints as Panavision Super 70. The system was designed to compete with the parallel development of the Arriflex 765 camera. The new System 65 camera was self-blimped, with reflex viewing designed as the 65 mm cousin to the 35 mm Panaflex camera (and used many of the same accessories).  Only two System 65 cameras were ever built, and the small fleet of old 65 mm handheld reflex cameras had their lens mounts modified to accept the System 65 lenses. The System 65 lenses were all a medium-format variant of lens designs from the (then) current line of Panavision Primos. All System 65 telephoto lenses (i.e. 300 mm, 400 mm, 500 mm) were converted Canon telephotos.  In the wake of the box office failure of the first Panavision System 65/Super 70 feature, the Tom Cruise/Nicole Kidman/Ron Howard directed vehicle, Far and Away, combined with the fact that 35 mm digital stereo sound had arrived and minimized the multi-channel sound advantage the 70 mm format had, meant that a hoped-for renaissance in 65/70 mm film production never really took off.

Movies using Panavision System 65/Super 70
 Far and Away (1992) – During the "land rush" sequence, slow motion footage was filmed with Arri 765 cameras; plus a 35mm VistaVision camera and several 35 mm Panavision cameras with anamorphic lenses were used.
 Dead Sea (1992) – short film released in the Los Angeles area
 Hamlet (1996)
 The Witness (1998) – short film produced for the Mashantucket Pequot Museum in Connecticut
 Spider-Man 2 (2004) – selected special effects shots only
 The New World (2005) – "hyper-reality" scenes only
 Inception (2010) – "key sequences"
 Shutter Island (2010) – some scenes
 The Tree of Life (2011) – selected scenes
 Samsara (2011) – the first feature film photographed entirely in 65mm since Hamlet; theatrical release was presented in 4K digital projection and 35mm anamorphic prints
 Snow White & the Huntsman (2012) – selected wide shots and second unit work
 The Dark Knight Rises (2012) – selected scenes
 The Master (2012) – The projected frame on 70mm release prints (and all digital prints) were "hard matted" to 1.85:1, clipping the sides and throwing away 16.3% of the full frame exposed on the 2.20:1 aspect ratio 65 mm negative. About 85% of the film was photographed in Panavision System 65; the rest was shot in spherical 35 mm with a 1.85:1 aspect ratio.
 To the Wonder (2012) – some scenes
 Jurassic World (2015) – some scenes
 Knight of Cups (2015) – some scenes
 Batman v Superman: Dawn of Justice (2016) – some scenes
 Dunkirk (2017) – scenes that were not shot on 65mm IMAX film, about 25% of the film
 Murder on the Orient Express (2017)
 Christopher Robin (2018) – some scenes
 The Nutcracker and the Four Realms (2018) – scenes that were not shot on Super 35 (3-perf)
Tenet (2020) – scenes that were not shot on 65mm IMAX film, some scenes were filmed with Arri 765 cameras, about 74 minutes of the film.
Wonder Woman 1984 (2020) - some scenes
No Time to Die (2021) – some action scenes 
Death on the Nile (2022)
 Jurassic World Dominion (2022) – some scenes
Nope (2022) – scenes that were not shot on 65mm IMAX film.
Oppenheimer (2023) - scenes that were not shot on 65mm IMAX film.

See also
 70 mm film
 Cinerama
 Super Technirama 70
 Todd-AO
 Ultra Panavision 70

References

External links
 American Widescreen Museum section on Super Panavision 70

70 mm film
Motion picture film formats
Panavision